Salman Dawood  is a former Iraqi football midfielder who played for Iraq between 1964 and 1967. He played 7 matches and scored 1 goal.

Career statistics

International goals
Scores and results list Iraq's goal tally first.

References

Iraqi footballers
Iraq international footballers
Living people
Association football midfielders
Year of birth missing (living people)